At least two warships of Japan have been named Unryū:

, an  launched in 1943 and sunk in 1944.
, a  launched in 2008.

Japanese Navy ship names